Lobelanidine is a chemical analog of lobeline.

References

Piperidine alkaloids